Seh Boneh (also known as Seh Boneh-ye Pā’īn and Seh Boneh-ye Soflá) is a village in Miyan Ab-e Shomali Rural District, in the Central District of Shushtar County, Khuzestan Province, Iran. At the 2006 census, its population was 392, in 77 families.

References 

Populated places in Shushtar County